Gehrmann is a surname. Notable people with the surname include:

Bernard E. Gehrmann (1920–2006), former member of the Wisconsin State Assembly
Bernard J. Gehrmann (1880–1958), U.S. Representative from Wisconsin
Don Gehrmann (born 1927), retired American middle-distance runner
Friedhelm Gehrmann (born 1939), German scientist in the field of economics and social sciences
Heike Gehrmann (born 1968), German former field hockey player who competed in the 1988 Summer Olympics
Paul Gehrmann (born 1995), German footballer

See also
Gehman
Germann
Ehrmann